The Eichelnkopf is a  high hill in the southwestern part of the Harz Mountains in the central German state of Lower Saxony.

Geography 
Its nearest neighbour is the Mittelecke. The hill is completely forested.

Walking 
There is a trail that runs from the north and over the summit. On the south slope of the Eichelnkopf, a trail runs past the 300-year-old "Owl Oak" (Euleneiche).

Geology 
On the eastern slopes is an isolated outcrop of dark argillaceous slate (Tonschiefer) from the Silurian period, which is one of the oldest rocks in the entire Harz.

References

Sources 
  Topographische Karte 1:25000 Nr. 4328 Bad Lauterberg im Harz
  Geologische Karte Harz 1:100000, Herausgegeben vom Landesamt für Geologie und Bergwesen Sachsen-Anhalt in Zusammenarbeit mit dem Niedersächsischen Landesamt für Bodenforschung, Halle 1998, 

Hills of the Harz
Hills of Lower Saxony
Osterode (district)